José Song Sui-Wan, SDB (May 16, 1941 – November 15, 2012) was the Roman Catholic bishop of the Roman Catholic Diocese of São Gabriel da Cachoeira, Brazil.

Born in Shanghai, China and moved to Brazil as an adolescent after spending time in Hong Kong (1949-1959).

Song was ordained to the priesthood as salesian in 1971 and was named bishop in 2002; he resigned in 2009. and died in 2012.

Motto 

VIDIMUS STELLAM EIUS IN ORIENTE (We saw His star in Orient)

Notes

External links 

 De episcopo Sui-Wan apud catholic-hierarchy.org
 Death of bishop Song Sui-wan in Salesian news 
 CNBB lamenta morte de dom José Song Sui Wan 
 Será sepultado hoje o bispo emérito de São Gabriel da Cachoeira 

1941 births
2012 deaths
21st-century Roman Catholic bishops in Brazil
Brazilian people of Chinese descent
Chinese emigrants to Brazil
Salesian bishops
People from Shanghai
Chinese emigrants to British Hong Kong
Roman Catholic bishops of São Gabriel da Cachoeira